William Veitch (27 April 1640 – 8 May 1722). He was the youngest son of John Veitch, the minister of Roberton, Lanarkshire. He was educated at the University of Glasgow, graduating with an M.A. in 1659. He became a tutor in the family of Sir Andrew Ker of Greenhead. He was licensed to preach by the Presbytery of Lanark in 1664. Having identified himself with the Pentland Rising, he was outlawed, and escaped to Newcastle, where he became chaplain in the family of the Mayor. In 1671 he was ordained to a meeting-house at Fallowlees, a remote spot among the Simonside Hills, Rothbury. From that he removed to Hanamhall, in the same district, and afterwards to Seaton Hall, Longhorsly. Whilst living at the latter place under the assumed name of William [or George] Johnston, he was arrested on 16 January, and sentenced to the Bass Rock 22 February 1679. (See Anderson's note below). Veitch was liberated on 17 July 1680, and returned to Newcastle. He aided Archibald, Earl of Argyll, in his escape from Scotland in 1681. In 1683 he went to Holland, and in 1685 he was again in Northumberland acting as an agent on behalf of Monmouth. Soon afterwards he was settled as minister of a meeting-house at Beverley, Yorkshire. Having returned to Scotland, he was called to Whitton Hall, Morebattle, April 1688. In 1690 he was minister of Peebles, and in September 1694, he was admitted to Dumfries. He demitted on 19 May 1715. His death was on 8 May 1722. In 1705 he presented to the church two communion cups.

Life
William Veitch (1640–1722) was a covenanter. He was the younger son of John Veitch, the minister of Roberton, Lanarkshire, and was born on 27 April 1640. He studied at the University of Glasgow, where he graduated with an M.A. in 1659. In 1660 he became tutor to the family of Sir Andrew Ker of Greenhead at the University of Edinburgh. About 1664 he took license as a preacher and joined the presbyterians; but, being forfeited in 1667 for having been at Mauchline and the Pentlands, he escaped to England, where he lived under the name of Johnson. For some time he was chaplain to the wife of the mayor of Newcastle; and, after preaching in London and other places, he was in 1671 ordained minister of a meeting-house at Faldlees and afterwards at Hanamhall in the parish of Rothbury, Northumberland, whence four years afterwards he removed to Seaton Hall in the parish of Longhorsly. On 16 January 1679 he was apprehended, while living there under the name of Johnson, but having been on 22 February sisted before the committee of public affairs in Edinburgh, he was sent to imprisonment on the Bass Rock.

The Bass Rock
James Anderson in his "Martyrs of the Bass" casts doubt that the sentence was executed. He says:

Later life
On 17 July following, he was, however, at liberty, and returned to Northumberland. When in December 1681 the Earl of Argyll escaped from prison, Veitch not only sheltered him in his house, but, being an adept in the shifts of a fugitive from justice, conducted him safely to London. Veitch had soon afterwards to make his own escape to Holland (in 1683), but during the Monmouth rising of 1685 was sent to Northumberland to foment an outbreak there. The Argyll fiasco put an end to the project; and, after remaining for some time in hiding under various names, Veitch became minister of a meeting-house at Beverley, Yorkshire, where he remained six or seven months. Returning to Scotland, he was called to the parish of Whitton Chapel in the presbytery of Kelso, where he was admitted in April 1688. In 1690 he was translated to Peebles, and in 1694 to Dumfries. He demitted his charge on 8 December 1714, and died on 8 May 1722.

Family
William's father John and brothers James and John were also ministers. His wife, Marion Fairlie of the house of Braid, was author of a diary which was published by the Free Church of Scotland in 1846. She died a day after her husband, and was buried in the same grave. By her Veitch had five sons and five daughters. The second son, Samuel, who adopted the spelling Vetch.
He married 23 November 1664, Marion Fairley, of the family of Braid, Edinburgh [vide Diary of Marion Fairley (Edinburgh, 1846)]. She died the day before (Scott says the day after) her husband, and was buried in the same grave within the church of Dumfries. They had issue — 
William, educated at Utrecht, entered the army of the Prince of Orange, captain in the Darien Expedition, died at sea, off Port Royal, Jamaica, 1699 ; 
Samuel (who adopted the spelling Vetch for his surname), first Governor of Nova Scotia, born 1668, died 30 April 1732; 
Ebenezer, minister of Ayr; 
Elizabeth (married 7 June 1710, David M'Culloch of Ardwall); 
Sarah, born 7 November 1677 (married James Young of Gully-hill, Holywood);
Agnes (married John Somerville, minister of Caerlaverock); 
Janet, buried 27 March 1693; 
and three others, who died young.

Works
He was the author of:
Two Sermons preached before Her Majesty's Commons at the Opening of Parliament (Edinburgh, 1693)
Two Sermons preached before the commission (Edinburgh, 1695)
A Short History of Rome's Designs against the Protestant Interest in Britain (Drumfries, 1718)
A Short Answer to a Letter pretendedly written by Mr John Hepburn, Division Maker, but really by Riddough and Hunter and other Romish Emissaries, who are Defenders of his Faith, both Summer and Winter (Dumfries, 1720) 
A portrait of Veitch is in the possession of his descendant, E. Denholm Young, W.S., Edinburgh

Bibliography
Paton's The Book of St Michael's Church

References
Citations

Other sources

Attribution

1640 births
1722 deaths
17th-century Scottish people
17th-century Protestant religious leaders